Shiloh Historic District is a historic area of downtown Springdale, Arkansas listed on the National Register of Historic Places. The district encompasses eighteen significant buildings within its , with eight having historic or architectural significance and twelve relating to the early commercial and industrial development of Springdale. Also included within the area are several roads of historic significance to the city.   The district covers an area straddling Spring Brook, around which the community developed beginning in the 1830s, and is roughly centered on the 1870 Shiloh Church building, which is the community's oldest surviving building.

History

Contributing properties
 Shiloh Church
 Berry-Braun House
 Smith-Searcy House
 Steele Store
 Springdale Library-Shiloh Museum of Ozark History
 Bookout House
 Berry-Braun Cottage
 American Legion Hut

See also
 National Register of Historic Places listings in Washington County, Arkansas

References

National Register of Historic Places in Washington County, Arkansas
Victorian architecture in Arkansas
Springdale, Arkansas
Historic districts on the National Register of Historic Places in Arkansas